Ronaldo Mulitalo (born 17 November 1999) is a professional rugby league footballer who plays as a er for the Cronulla-Sutherland Sharks in the National Rugby League (NRL). He has played for both  and New Zealand at international level.

Background
Mulitalo was born in South Auckland, New Zealand, and is of Samoan descent. His mother's family is from American Samoa.

He played his junior rugby league for the Ellerslie Eagles and attended Marcellin College, Auckland before moving to Ipswich, Queensland in October 2013. While in Ipswich, he attended Ipswich State High School and played for the Springfield Panthers.

Playing career

Early career
In 2015, Mulitalo played for the Ipswich Jets Cyril Connell Cup side and moved up to their Mal Meninga Cup side in 2016. In 2017, he signed with the Cronulla-Sutherland Sharks, playing for the SG Ball Cup side which made it to the Grand Final. Later that year, he represented Queensland under-18. In 2018, Mulitalo moved up to the Sharks' Jersey Flegg Cup side.

2019
Mulitalo started the 2019 season playing for Cronulla's Canterbury Cup NSW feeder side, Newtown.

On 26 April, after starting 2019 as a development player, Mulitalo signed a contract extension and was immediately elevated into Cronulla's top 30 squad. A day later, he made his NRL debut against the Brisbane Broncos as a late replacement for Josh Dugan, who was injured during the warm-up. In July, he played fullback for the Queensland under-20 side, scoring a try in their loss to New South Wales.
In Round 19 against North Queensland, Mulitalo scored his first try in the top grade as Cronulla won the match 16-14 at Shark Park.
In Round 24 against Canberra, Mulitalo scored 2 tries as Cronulla lost the match 15-14 in Golden Point extra-time at Shark Park.

In round 25 against the Wests Tigers, Mulitalo was placed on report and later suspended for one match after using an illegal shoulder charge on Wests player Luke Brooks.

Mulitalo played for Cronulla's feeder side Newtown in their Canterbury Cup NSW grand final victory over the Wentworthville Magpies at Bankwest Stadium, scoring a try in a 20-15 win.
The following week, Mulitalo played for Newtown in the NRL State Championship victory over the Burleigh Bears at ANZ Stadium.

At the end of the 2019 season, Mulitalo was selected in the United States national rugby league team for the 2019 Rugby League World Cup 9s. He qualifies through his American Samoan heritage.

2020
In round 4 of the 2020 NRL season, Mulitalo scored two tries as Cronulla-Sutherland won their first game of the year defeating North Queensland 26-16 at Queensland Country Bank Stadium.

In round 18, he scored two tries in Cronulla's 22-14 victory over the New Zealand Warriors at Kogarah Oval.  The second try he scored turned out to be the winner which saw Cronulla finish in the top 8 and qualify for the finals at New Zealand's expense.

2021
In round 12 of the 2021 NRL season, he scored two tries in Cronulla-Sutherland's 38-10 victory over the Gold Coast.

Mulitalo was named to make his State of Origin debut for Queensland in game 2 as a late replacement for Reece Walsh, however, Mulitalo was found to be ineligible for Queensland as he did not reside in the state prior to his 13th birthday, controversially, Mulitalo had previously been selected for and represented QRL Queensland age grade sides.

In round 23, Mulitalo scored two tries for Cronulla in a 50-20 victory over the Wests Tigers.  In the second half of the match, Mulitalo was taken from the field with a suspected broken jaw.
He played 16 games for Cronulla and scored 10 tries in the 2021 NRL season which saw the club narrowly miss the finals by finishing 9th on the table.

2022
In round 6 of the 2022 NRL season, Mulitalo scored two tries for Cronulla in a 34-18 loss against Melbourne.  The following week, he scored another two tries in Cronulla's 34–22 victory over Manly.
In round 14, Mulitalo scored two tries for Cronulla in a 38-16 victory over the New Zealand Warriors.
Mulitalo played a total of 24 games for Cronulla in throughout the season scoring 17 tries to become the clubs top try scorer for the year.  Mulitalo played in both finals matches as they were eliminated in straight sets.

Statistics

NRL
 Statistics are correct as of the end of the 2022 season

International

References

External links
Cronulla Sharks profile
NRL profile

1999 births
Living people
New Zealand rugby league players
New Zealand national rugby league team players
New Zealand sportspeople of Samoan descent
New Zealand people of American Samoan descent
New Zealand emigrants to Australia
Cronulla-Sutherland Sharks players
Newtown Jets NSW Cup players
Rugby league players from Auckland
Rugby league wingers
Samoa national rugby league team players
United States national rugby league team players
People educated at Marcellin College, Auckland